Norsa is a surname. Notable people with the surname include:

Hannah Norsa (1712–1784), English Jewish actress and singer
Medea Norsa (1877–1952), Italian papyrologist and philologist
Michele Norsa (born 1948), Italian manager